Fjellbergella is a genus of proturans in the family Acerentomidae.

Species
 Fjellbergella tuxeni Nosek, 1978

References

Protura